Allison Township is located in Lawrence County, Illinois. As of the 2010 census, its population was 267 and it contained 166 housing units.

Allison Township derives its name from Allison's Prairie, which was settled by the Allison family in the 1810s.

Geography

Demographics

References

External links
City-data.com
Illinois State Archives

Townships in Lawrence County, Illinois
Townships in Illinois